The Dudești culture is a farming/herding culture that occupied part of Romania in the 6th millennium BC, typified by semi-subterranean habitations (Zemlyanki) on the edges of low plateaus. This culture contributed to the origin of both the subsequent Hamangia culture and the Boian culture. It was named after Dudești, a quarter in the southeast of Bucharest.

See also
 Prehistoric Romania

References 

Archaeological cultures in Romania
Neolithic cultures of Europe
Archaeological cultures of Southeastern Europe
6th-millennium BC establishments